The Winter Lake is an Irish (and Canadian) 2020 drama/mystery movie, written by David Turpin, and directed by Phil Sheerin. Its principal characters are Tom (Anson Boon), Elaine (Charlie Murphy), Holly (Emma Mackey), Ward (Michael McElhatton), and Col (Mark McKenna).

Plot

Tom is an introverted and troubled young man living with his struggling mother Elaine, the pair having just moved into a house that they have inherited. They have come from a distressing family background. Tom explores the nearby 'turlach', a winter lake fed by a mysterious and dangerous intermittently flowing underground river. He finds a dreadful relic in the water. He has a Stanley knife. Elaine needs the help of her neighbour Ward, who jealously watches over his daughter Holly, a manipulative young woman who picks up on Tom. Holly intuits that Tom has found the relic. Ward will do anything to prevent people from knowing about the relic. Holly steers Tom towards killing Ward.

The winter lake

The words 'winter lake' in the title of the movie refer to a particular kind of water course that occurs in parts of Ireland, called in Irish a 'turlach'. Holly uses that Irish term in the movie.

References

External links
 
 The Winter Lake at Library and Archives Canada

2020 drama films
Irish drama films